Rémy Weil (17 December 1899 – 20 November 1943) was a French freestyle swimmer and diver. He competed at the 1920 Summer Olympics and 1924 Summer Olympics. He was murdered in the Auschwitz concentration camp during World War II.

References

External links
 

1899 births
1943 deaths
French male divers
French male freestyle swimmers
Olympic divers of France
Olympic swimmers of France
Divers at the 1920 Summer Olympics
Swimmers at the 1920 Summer Olympics
Divers at the 1924 Summer Olympics
Sportspeople from Strasbourg
French civilians killed in World War II
French people who died in Auschwitz concentration camp